Gerbach is a municipality in the Donnersbergkreis district, in Rhineland-Palatinate, Germany.

Geography 
The village is situated on the Appelbach in the North Palatinate Highlands northwest of the Donnersberg between Kaiserslautern and Bad Kreuznach. 
Gerbach also includes the residential areas Althof, Kahlenbergweiher, Köhlerhof and Schneebergerhof.[2] The Campingpark Pfalz is also located in the municipal area.

History 
The first documentary mention was made in 1192. Until the end of the 18th century Gerbach belonged to the county of Falkenstein.

In 1794 the left bank of the Rhine was occupied in the First Coalition War. From 1798 to 1814 Gerbach belonged to the canton of Kirchheim (also called Kirchheimbolanden) in the department of Donnersberg. As a result of the Congress of Vienna he was Bavarian from 1816 to 1945. After the Second World War, Gerbach was part of the French occupation zone and was incorporated into the newly formed state of Rhineland-Palatinate in 1946.

Politics 
The municipal council in Gerbach consists of twelve council members who were elected in a majority vote at the local elections on 26 May 2019, and the honorary local mayor as chairman.

Emblem 
Blasonation: "In gold on a green shield foot a green frog, behind it a willow with brown trunk and green foliage."

Economy and Infrastructure 
In Gerbach there is a primary school which is also responsible for Bayerfeld-Steckweiler, Dielkirchen, St. Alban, Ruppertsecken and Würzweiler.

The L 385 and L 400 intersect in the village. The A 63 in the southeast connects to long-distance traffic. In Rockenhausen there is a train station of the Alsenztalbahn.

Gerbach has a very traditional male choral society, founded in 1861. In 2011 there was an anniversary celebration (150 years). Furthermore, a carnival club is very active in the community as well as a sports club (Soccer, Table Tennis, Aerobic).

Buildings 
In the village there is the catholic church St. Michael.

At Gerbach, there is the world's most powerful wind turbine, an Enercon E-126 with axis height of 135 metres and rotor diameter of 127 metres with a generation capacity of 7.5 MW.
At the end of 2013, a rotor blade came loose and crashed to the ground. This was caused by several cracked bolts on the rotor blade attachment. In May 2014, the turbine was put back into operation after being repaired.

Sons and daughters of the community  
Matthias Willenbacher (1969), physicist and entrepreneur

References

Municipalities in Rhineland-Palatinate
Donnersbergkreis